Frax or FraX or FRAX may refer to:
Frax, a villain in the Power Rangers: Time Force fictional universe
Frax, a henchman in the Doctor Who fictional universe
Frax, a character in the Bucky O'Hare fictional universe
FraX, an abbreviation for Fragile X Syndrome or the associated gene
FRAX, a tool for assessing risk of fracture due to osteoporosis developed by the University of Sheffield
Frax, an abbreviation for Fractional Ownership
Frax, an app for realtime fractal exploration
FRAX, a fractional reserve stablecoin cryptocurrency